The Villa dei Sette Bassi (also Villa Via Tuscolana) is an archaeological site located in Rome, Italy.

The site is located at the fifth mile of Via Tuscolana to the southeast of Rome and forms part of the Appian Way Regional Park. It was the second-largest villa in the suburbs of Ancient Rome after that of Quintiles. The name, known since the Middle Ages, is derived from Septimius Basso, prefect under the Emperor Septimius Severus (193–211), and a possible owner of the villa. The site, however, dates back to Antoninus Pius (138–161) and was inhabited until the beginning of the fourth century, and maintained by additional restorations for two more centuries. Six Roman marble sculptures from the site can be found in the British Museum.

The residential area consists of three contiguous parts, dating back to three different stages following rapid chronological succession. The parts are rectangular and are arranged aligned from east to west. There were also gardens and a main park onto which the buildings looked. The easternmost building was built between 134 and 139 at the beginning of the reign of Antoninus Pius following a traditional structure of 50 meters on each side and a peristyle in the northwest of about 45 square meters per side. The plan is compact, with no windows facing outward. The second building was constructed to the southwest of the previous peristyle, between 140 and 150. It has a length of 45 m and is 25 m wide, and includes a panoramic south-facing rotunda. It is a structure linked to luxury, without any functional character. The third structure is believed to have been constructed at the end of the reign of Antoninus Pius, and is the most elaborate with large spa rooms.

To the northwest of the villa was a series of houses with warehouses, temples and cisterns. This was where the  rural population lived and most of the agricultural and domestic activities took place. The area has not been the subject of archaeological investigation but remains of a small temple are clearly visible. This was rectangular and constructed of brick, had vaulted ceilings and was gabled. It contained a rectangular apse for the Divine Statue. The area of the villa also contained a Hippodrome, as well as cisterns that obtained their water from an aqueduct dedicated to the villa. Remains of one of the cisterns form the foundations of a farmhouse on the property.

The condition of these ruins is poor. In February 2014 a buttress collapsed. This was attributed to heavy rain but excavations have shown that the building materials used were of low quality. Also the area was subjected to some bombing during the Second World War.

See also 

 Roman Villa
 Villa of the Quintilii
 Appian Way Regional Park

References

Bibliography 
 R. Egidi, "Villa dei Sette Bassi," in C. Kicking, Rome archaeological, Rome 2005, p. 442-444.
 M. De Franceschini, "Villa Via Tuscolana, the Seven Netherlands", in Ville Agro Romano, Rome 2005, p. 209-214.W

External links

Ancient Roman buildings and structures in Rome
Se